Henry Spalding may refer to:

 Henry H. Spalding (1803–1874), Presbyterian missionary
 Henry Spalding (architect) (1838–1910), British architect
 Henry S. Spalding (1865–1934), author